Dolichandrone spathacea, also known as tui or mangrove trumpet tree ( or แคป่า, khae thale or khae pa; , tue or tuy), is a species of plant in the  family Bignoniaceae. It is found from South India, Sri Lanka to New Caledonia.

Cultural significance
In Sri Lanka, it is known as "දිය දග - diya daga" in Sinhala.

In Southeast Asia, the leaves and barks of the Dolichandrone spathacea are used as traditional herbal medicine which is used to treat bacterial infections such as oral thrush, bronchitis, and gastrointestinal diseases.
 

The flower is edible and it is part of Thai cuisine, where it is known as Dok Khae Thale or Dok Khae Pa, being sometimes confused with Markhamia stipulata —also having the alternative name แคป่า Dok Khae Pa in Thai. The Dolichandrone spathacea flower, however, is white and not yellowish or red and looks thinner. It is usually eaten sauteed or in Kaeng som.

See also
Markhamia stipulata, also known as แคป่า khae pa in Thai 
Sesbania grandiflora, known as ดอกแค khae in Thai 
Edible flowers
List of Thai ingredients

References

External links

spathacea
Flora of tropical Asia